Ciprian Vasilache (born 14 September 1983) is a Romanian former professional footballer who played as a midfielder. Vasilache made his début in Liga I with Gloria Bistrița, in 2002. Between January 2004 and January 2007 he played for Rapid București, becoming a key member of the first team squad and scoring important goals during the 2005–06 UEFA Cup, against Vardar Skopje and Feyenoord.

Honours
Rapid București
 Cupa României: 2005–06

External links

1983 births
Sportspeople from Baia Mare
Living people
Romanian footballers
Association football midfielders
Liga I players
Liga II players
Ukrainian Premier League players
K League 2 players
National League (English football) players
ACF Gloria Bistrița players
FC Rapid București players
CS Pandurii Târgu Jiu players
CSM Ceahlăul Piatra Neamț players
ASA 2013 Târgu Mureș players
CS Gaz Metan Mediaș players
FC Bihor Oradea players
FC Vorskla Poltava players
Gangwon FC players
Chungju Hummel FC players
CS Minaur Baia Mare (football) players
Bishop's Stortford F.C. players
Romanian expatriate footballers
Romanian expatriate sportspeople in Ukraine
Expatriate footballers in Ukraine
Romanian expatriate sportspeople in South Korea
Expatriate footballers in South Korea
Romanian expatriate sportspeople in England
Expatriate footballers in England